Luka Tiodorović (Cyrillic: Лука Тиодоровић; born 21 January 1986) is a Montenegrin retired footballer who last played for Mladost Lješkopolje.

Club career
Born in Titograd, SR Montenegro, Tiodorović played in the youth teams of Red Star Belgrade and FK Budućnost Podgorica. He made his senior debut in 2005 playing with FK Kom in the Second League of Serbia and Montenegro. He would then play with FK Dečić in the inaugural season of the Montenegrin First League. In summer 2007 he moved to FK Mogren where he will play for the following three seasons. He will play with Mogren in their 2009–10 UEFA Champions League campaign. In summer 2010 he moved back to Budućnost but will spend the second half of the season playing with FK Mladost Podgorica.

In summer 2011 he moved abroad and joined Polish club Polonia Bytom. After making only 2 appearances in the I Liga during the 2011–12 season, he left Poland.

In August 2012, after a successful trial period, he signed with Serbian top-flight side FK Smederevo.

National team
He was member of the Montenegrin U-21 team.

Honours
Mogren
Montenegrin First League: 2008–09
Montenegrin Cup: 2008

References

External links
 Luka Tiodorovic at srbijafudbal.net
 

1986 births
Living people
Footballers from Podgorica
Association football midfielders
Serbia and Montenegro footballers
Montenegrin footballers
Montenegro under-21 international footballers
FK Kom players
FK Dečić players
FK Mogren players
FK Budućnost Podgorica players
OFK Titograd players
Polonia Bytom players
FK Smederevo players
Luftëtari Gjirokastër players
FK Mornar players
KS Lushnja players
FK Radnički 1923 players
FK Lovćen players
FK Jedinstvo Bijelo Polje players
FK Podgorica players
Second League of Serbia and Montenegro players
Montenegrin First League players
Serbian SuperLiga players
Kategoria Superiore players
Serbian First League players
Montenegrin Second League players
Montenegrin expatriate footballers
Expatriate footballers in Poland
Montenegrin expatriate sportspeople in Poland
Expatriate footballers in Serbia
Montenegrin expatriate sportspeople in Serbia
Expatriate footballers in Albania
Montenegrin expatriate sportspeople in Albania